Leoni Jansen (born 18 September 1955) is a Dutch singer who performs American folk music and Celtic music. She is well known for her work in television during the 1980s.

References

External links
 

 (Dutch, with some English)

1955 births
Living people
Dutch women singers
Dutch television news presenters
People from Leiden
People from Maarssen
Women television journalists